The 2000 Premier League speedway season was the second division of speedway in the United Kingdom and governed by the Speedway Control Board (SCB), in conjunction with the British Speedway Promoters' Association (BSPA).

Season summary
The League consisted of 14 teams for the 2000 season with the addition of the Hull Vikings who dropped down from the Elite League. 

The League was run on a standard format with no play-offs and was won by Exeter Falcons.

Final table

Premier League Knockout Cup
The 2000 Premier League Knockout Cup was the 33rd edition of the Knockout Cup for tier two teams. Swindon Robins were the winners of the competition.

First round

Second round

Semi-finals

Final
First leg

Second leg

Swindon were declared Knockout Cup Champions, winning on aggregate 101–79.

Leading averages

Riders & final averages
Arena Essex

Colin White 8.12
Troy Pratt 7.72
Jan Pedersen 6.55
Savalas Clouting 6.44
Gary Corbett 5.85
Matt Read 5.60
Brent Collyer 5.43
Justin Elkins 5.10
David Mason 3.93
Luke Clifton 2.80
Barrie Evans .2.65
Jon Underwood 2.26

Berwick

Alan Mogridge 9.07
Paul Bentley 8.21 
Scott Lamb 7.45
David Meldrum 7.17
Jörg Pingel 7.03
Scott Smith 6.91
Dean Felton 4.16
Freddie Stephenson 3.49
Steven McAllister 2.00
Wesley Waite 1.14

Edinburgh

Peter Carr 10.28
Robert Eriksson 9.31
Kevin Little 6.46
Ross Brady 5.48
Blair Scott 5.20
Christian Henry 4.30
Will Beveridge 3.74
Jonathan Swales 2.00

Exeter

Michael Coles 9.26
Mark Simmonds 7.79
Seemond Stephens 7.77
Chris Harris 7.05 
Roger Lobb 7.05 
Bobby Eldridge 6.76 
Graeme Gordon 6.20 
Wayne Barrett 3.00

Glasgow

Les Collins 8.55 
James Grieves 7.97
Mark Courtney 7.14
Emiliano Sanchez 6.50 
Richard Juul 6.32
Aidan Collins 4.58
Russell Harrison 4.39
Sean Courtney 4.00
Scott Courtney 2.97

Hull

Paul Thorp 8.79
Garry Stead 8.25
Lee Dicken 7.15
Paul Smith 6.89
Rene Aas 6.10
Mike Smith 5.51
Jamie Smith 3.03
Wesley Waite 1.38

Isle of Wight

Ray Morton 10.09
Danny Bird 6.96
Scott Swain 6.93
Adam Shields 6.78
Richard Juul 5.59
Glen Phillips 4.28
Tommy Palmer 4.00
Adrian Newman 3.09

Newcastle

Bjarne Pedersen 9.70 
Jesper Olsen 8.20
Stuart Swales 7.57
Andre Compton 7.43
Grant MacDonald 5.27
Will Beveridge 5.00
Paul Macklin 3.74
Rob Grant Jr 3.63
Krister Marsh 3.62
Darren Pearson 3.51
Jamie Smith 3.20

Newport

Anders Henriksson 8.68
Ben Howe 8.27
Andrew Appleton 7.21
Chris Neath 6.92
Jon Armstrong 4.74
Craig Taylor 4.68
Nathan Murray 4.17
Chris Courage 3.32
Lee Herne 2.51

Reading

Armando Castagna 8.88
Phil Morris 8.44
Per Wester 6.96
Paul Clews 6.25
Krister Marsh 5.61
Shane Colvin 3.93
Marc Norris 3.61
Lee Herne 2.67

Sheffield

Sean Wilson 10.27 
Robbie Kessler 8.72
Simon Stead 8.31
Paul Lee 5.74
Adam Allott 4.85
Simon Cartwright 4.64
James Birkinshaw 3.65
Andrew Moore 3.19

Stoke

Paul Pickering 8.78
David Walsh 7.75
Mark Burrows 6.92
Tony Atkin 6.20
Wayne Broadhurst 4.53
Paul Macklin 2.56
Steven McAllister 2.29

Swindon

Paul Fry 8.89
Frank Smart 8.79
Neil Collins 7.32
Claus Kristensen 7.13
Martin Dixon 6.70
Oliver Allen 6.58
Mark Steel 5.21
Nathan Murray 4.32

Workington

Carl Stonehewer 9.89 
Brent Werner 8.74
Peter I Karlsson 8.69
Mick Powell 8.62
Lee Smethills 5.22
Barry Campbell 4.80
Adrian Newman 3.36
Geoff Powell 3.19
James Mann 2.34
Jamie Swales 1.03

See also
List of United Kingdom Speedway League Champions
Knockout Cup (speedway)

References

Speedway Premier League
2000 in speedway
2000 in British motorsport